The eighth season of Matlock originally aired in the United States on ABC from September 23, 1993, concludes with a two-hour season finale on  May 19, 1994.

Cast

Main 
 Andy Griffith as Ben Matlock
 Brynn Thayer as Leanne McIntyre
 Daniel Roebuck as Cliff Lewis

Recurring 
 Clarence Gilyard Jr. as Conrad McMasters

Cast notes
 Brynn Thayer departed at the end of the season
 Brynn Thayer missed an episode
 Daniel Roebuck missed six episodes

Episodes

References

External links 
 

1993 American television seasons
1994 American television seasons
08